Harlingen Consolidated Independent School District is a school district headquartered in Harlingen, Texas (USA).  It was founded August 5, 1950 via the merger of the Harlingen Independent School District and the Stuart Place Independent School District.

HCISD serves most of the city of Harlingen, part of the city of San Benito, the city of Palm Valley, the towns of Combes and Primera, and portions of unincorporated Cameron County, including Juarez, Las Palmas, and Lasana.

HCISD has its own TV station locally broadcast in Harlingen on cable provided by Time Warner Cable of the Rio Grande Valley. KHGN-TV is used to inform parents and students of updates involving Harlingen and its schools.  Also aired on KHGN is Harlingen High School's Cardinal News and Nonsense and Harlingen High School South's Southern Scoop.

The HCISD district office and KHGN-TV Channel 17 TV station are located at 407 N. 77 Sunshine Strip in Harlingen, Texas (78550).

In 2009, the school district was rated "academically acceptable" by the Texas Education Agency.

In 2018, Dishman Elementary was named a Blue Ribbon School by U.S. Department of Education.

Schools

High Schools (Grades 8,9-12) 
 Harlingen High School (established 1913; mascot: Cardinal; serves 10th-12th grade)
 Harlingen High School South (established 1993; mascot: Hawk; serves 10th-12th grade)
 Harlingen Collegiate High School (Harlingen)|Early College High School]] (established 2007; mascot: Owl; serves 9th-12th grade)
 Cano Ninth Grade Academy (established 2013; mascot: Raven; serves 9th grade)
 Harlingen School of Health Professions (established 2014; mascot: Phoenix; serves 8th-12th grade)

Middle Schools (Grades 6-8) 
 Coakley Middle School
 Gutierrez Middle School
 Memorial Middle School
 Vela Middle School
 Vernon Middle School
 STEM2 Preparatory Academy

Elementary Schools (Grades PK-5) 
Austin Elementary
Bonham Elementary
Bowie Elementary
Crockett Elementary
Dishman Elementary
Houston Elementary
Jefferson Elementary
Lamar Elementary
Long Elementary
Milam Elementary
Rodriguez Elementary
Stuart Elementary
Travis Elementary
Treasure Hills Elementary
Wilson Elementary
Zavala Elementary
Lee Means Elementary

Other Campuses 
 KEYS Academy
 New Pathways Center
 Secondary Alternative Center

References

External links 

 
 

Harlingen, Texas
School districts in Cameron County, Texas